Jarosław Krzyżanowski (born 10 February 1975) is a retired Polish football midfielder.

References

1975 births
Living people
Polish footballers
Zagłębie Lubin players
Górnik Polkowice players
AEL Limassol players
Miedź Legnica players
Wisła Płock players
Association football midfielders
Polish expatriate footballers
Expatriate footballers in Cyprus
Polish expatriate sportspeople in Cyprus